Diabetes, also known as diabetes mellitus, is a group of common endocrine diseases characterized by sustained high blood sugar levels. Diabetes is due to either the pancreas not producing enough insulin, or the cells of the body not responding properly to the insulin produced.  Diabetes, if left untreated, leads to many health  complications. Untreated or poorly treated diabetes accounts for approximately 1.5 million deaths per year.

There is no widely-accepted cure for most cases of diabetes. The most common treatment for type 1 diabetes is insulin replacement therapy (insulin injections). Anti-diabetic medications such as metformin and semaglutide, as well as lifestyle modifications, can be used to prevent or respond to type 2 diabetes. Gestational diabetes normally resolves shortly after delivery. 

As of 2019, an estimated 463 million people had diabetes worldwide accounting for 8.8% of the adult population. Type 2 diabetes makes up about 90% of all diabetes cases. The prevalence of the disease continues to increase, most dramatically in low- and middle-income nations. Rates are similar in women and men, with diabetes being the 7th-leading cause of death globally. The global expenditure on diabetes-related healthcare is an estimated USD760 billion a year.

Signs and symptoms

The classic symptoms of untreated diabetes are unintended weight loss, polyuria (increased urination), polydipsia (increased thirst), and polyphagia (increased hunger). Symptoms may develop rapidly (weeks or months) in type 1 diabetes, while they usually develop much more slowly and may be subtle or absent in type 2 diabetes.

Several other signs and symptoms can mark the onset of diabetes although they are not specific to the disease. In addition to the known symptoms listed above, they include blurred vision, headache, fatigue, slow healing of cuts, and itchy skin. Prolonged high blood glucose can cause glucose absorption in the lens of the eye, which leads to changes in its shape, resulting in vision changes. Long-term vision loss can also be caused by diabetic retinopathy. A number of skin rashes that can occur in diabetes are collectively known as diabetic dermadromes.

Diabetic emergencies
People with diabetes (usually but not exclusively in type 1 diabetes) may also experience diabetic ketoacidosis (DKA), a metabolic disturbance characterized by nausea, vomiting and abdominal pain, the smell of acetone on the breath, deep breathing known as Kussmaul breathing, and in severe cases a decreased level of consciousness. DKA requires emergency treatment in hospital. A rarer but more dangerous condition is hyperosmolar hyperglycemic state (HHS), which is more common in type 2 diabetes and is mainly the result of dehydration caused by high blood sugars.

Treatment-related low blood sugar (hypoglycemia) is common in people with type 1 and also type 2 diabetes depending on the medication being used. Most cases are mild and are not considered medical emergencies. Effects can range from feelings of unease, sweating, trembling, and increased appetite in mild cases to more serious effects such as confusion, changes in behavior such as aggressiveness, seizures, unconsciousness, and rarely permanent brain damage or death in severe cases. Rapid breathing, sweating, and cold, pale skin are characteristic of low blood sugar but not definitive. Mild to moderate cases are self-treated by eating or drinking something high in rapidly absorbed carbohydrates. Severe cases can lead to unconsciousness and must be treated with intravenous glucose or injections with glucagon.

Complications

All forms of diabetes increase the risk of long-term complications. These typically develop after many years (10–20) but may be the first symptom in those who have otherwise not received a diagnosis before that time.

The major long-term complications relate to damage to blood vessels. Diabetes doubles the risk of cardiovascular disease and about 75% of deaths in people with diabetes are due to coronary artery disease. Other macrovascular diseases include stroke, and peripheral artery disease. These complications are also a strong risk factor for severe COVID-19 illness.

The primary complications of diabetes due to damage in small blood vessels include damage to the eyes, kidneys, and nerves. Damage to the eyes, known as diabetic retinopathy, is caused by damage to the blood vessels in the retina of the eye, and can result in gradual vision loss and eventual blindness. Diabetes also increases the risk of having glaucoma, cataracts, and other eye problems. It is recommended that people with diabetes visit an optometrist or ophthalmologist once a year. Damage to the kidneys, known as diabetic nephropathy, can lead to tissue scarring, urine protein loss, and eventually chronic kidney disease, sometimes requiring dialysis or kidney transplantation. Damage to the nerves of the body, known as diabetic neuropathy, is the most common complication of diabetes. The symptoms can include numbness, tingling, sudomotor dysfunction, pain, and altered pain sensation, which can lead to damage to the skin. Diabetes-related foot problems (such as diabetic foot ulcers) may occur, and can be difficult to treat, occasionally requiring amputation. Additionally, proximal diabetic neuropathy causes painful muscle atrophy and weakness.

There is a link between cognitive deficit and diabetes. Compared to those without diabetes, those with the disease have a 1.2 to 1.5-fold greater rate of decline in cognitive function. Having diabetes, especially when on insulin, increases the risk of falls in older people.

Causes

Diabetes mellitus is classified into six categories: type 1 diabetes, type 2 diabetes, hybrid forms of diabetes, hyperglycemia first detected during pregnancy, "unclassified diabetes", and "other specific types". "Hybrid forms of diabetes" include slowly evolving, immune-mediated diabetes of adults and ketosis-prone type 2 diabetes. "Hyperglycemia first detected during pregnancy" includes gestational diabetes mellitus and diabetes mellitus in pregnancy (type 1 or type 2 diabetes first diagnosed during pregnancy). The "other specific types" are a collection of a few dozen individual causes. Diabetes is a more variable disease than once thought and people may have combinations of forms.

Type 1

Type 1 diabetes is characterized by loss of the insulin-producing beta cells of the pancreatic islets, leading to insulin deficiency. This type can be further classified as immune-mediated or idiopathic. The majority of type 1 diabetes is of an immune-mediated nature, in which a T cell-mediated autoimmune attack leads to the loss of beta cells and thus insulin. It causes approximately 10% of diabetes mellitus cases in North America and Europe. Most affected people are otherwise healthy and of a healthy weight when onset occurs. Sensitivity and responsiveness to insulin are usually normal, especially in the early stages. Although it has been called "juvenile diabetes" due to the frequent onset in children, the majority of individuals living with type 1 diabetes are now adults.

"Brittle" diabetes, also known as unstable diabetes or labile diabetes, is a term that was traditionally used to describe the dramatic and recurrent swings in glucose levels, often occurring for no apparent reason in insulin-dependent diabetes. This term, however, has no biologic basis and should not be used. Still, type 1 diabetes can be accompanied by irregular and unpredictable high blood sugar levels, and the potential for diabetic ketoacidosis or serious low blood sugar levels. Other complications include an impaired counterregulatory response to low blood sugar, infection, gastroparesis (which leads to erratic absorption of dietary carbohydrates), and endocrinopathies (e.g., Addison's disease). These phenomena are believed to occur no more frequently than in 1% to 2% of persons with type 1 diabetes.

Type 1 diabetes is partly inherited, with multiple genes, including certain HLA genotypes, known to influence the risk of diabetes. In genetically susceptible people, the onset of diabetes can be triggered by one or more environmental factors, such as a viral infection or diet. Several viruses have been implicated, but to date there is no stringent evidence to support this hypothesis in humans.

Type 1 diabetes can occur at any age, and a significant proportion is diagnosed during adulthood. Latent autoimmune diabetes of adults (LADA) is the diagnostic term applied when type 1 diabetes develops in adults; it has a slower onset than the same condition in children. Given this difference, some use the unofficial term "type 1.5 diabetes" for this condition. Adults with LADA are frequently initially misdiagnosed as having type 2 diabetes, based on age rather than a cause.

Type 2

Type 2 diabetes is characterized by insulin resistance, which may be combined with relatively reduced insulin secretion. The defective responsiveness of body tissues to insulin is believed to involve the insulin receptor. However, the specific defects are not known. Diabetes mellitus cases due to a known defect are classified separately. Type 2 diabetes is the most common type of diabetes mellitus accounting for 95% of diabetes. Many people with type 2 diabetes have evidence of prediabetes (impaired fasting glucose and/or impaired glucose tolerance) before meeting the criteria for type 2 diabetes. The progression of prediabetes to overt type 2 diabetes can be slowed or reversed by lifestyle changes or medications that improve insulin sensitivity or reduce the liver's glucose production.

Type 2 diabetes is primarily due to lifestyle factors and genetics. A number of lifestyle factors are known to be important to the development of type 2 diabetes, including obesity (defined by a body mass index of greater than 30), lack of physical activity, poor diet, stress, and urbanization. Excess body fat is associated with 30% of cases in people of Chinese and Japanese descent, 60–80% of cases in those of European and African descent, and 100% of Pima Indians and Pacific Islanders. Even those who are not obese may have a high waist–hip ratio.

Dietary factors such as sugar-sweetened drinks are associated with an increased risk. The type of fats in the diet is also important, with saturated fat and trans fats increasing the risk and polyunsaturated and monounsaturated fat decreasing the risk. Eating white rice excessively may increase the risk of diabetes, especially in Chinese and Japanese people. Lack of physical activity may increase the risk of diabetes in some people.

Adverse childhood experiences, including abuse, neglect, and household difficulties, increase the likelihood of type 2 diabetes later in life by 32%, with neglect having the strongest effect.

Antipsychotic medication side effects (specifically metabolic abnormalities, dyslipidemia and weight gain) and unhealthy lifestyles (including poor diet and decreased physical activity), are potential risk factors.

Gestational diabetes

Gestational diabetes resembles type 2 diabetes in several respects, involving a combination of relatively inadequate insulin secretion and responsiveness. It occurs in about 2–10% of all pregnancies and may improve or disappear after delivery. It is recommended that all pregnant women get tested starting around 24–28 weeks gestation. It is most often diagnosed in the second or third trimester because of the increase in insulin-antagonist hormone levels that occurs at this time. However, after pregnancy approximately 5–10% of women with gestational diabetes are found to have another form of diabetes, most commonly type 2. Gestational diabetes is fully treatable, but requires careful medical supervision throughout the pregnancy. Management may include dietary changes, blood glucose monitoring, and in some cases, insulin may be required.

Though it may be transient, untreated gestational diabetes can damage the health of the fetus or mother. Risks to the baby include macrosomia (high birth weight), congenital heart and central nervous system abnormalities, and skeletal muscle malformations. Increased levels of insulin in a fetus's blood may inhibit fetal surfactant production and cause infant respiratory distress syndrome. A high blood bilirubin level may result from red blood cell destruction. In severe cases, perinatal death may occur, most commonly as a result of poor placental perfusion due to vascular impairment. Labor induction may be indicated with decreased placental function. A caesarean section may be performed if there is marked fetal distress or an increased risk of injury associated with macrosomia, such as shoulder dystocia.

Other types
Maturity onset diabetes of the young (MODY) is a rare autosomal dominant inherited form of diabetes, due to one of several single-gene mutations causing defects in insulin production. It is significantly less common than the three main types, constituting 1–2% of all cases. The name of this disease refers to early hypotheses as to its nature. Being due to a defective gene, this disease varies in age at presentation and in severity according to the specific gene defect; thus, there are at least 13 subtypes of MODY. People with MODY often can control it without using insulin.

Some cases of diabetes are caused by the body's tissue receptors not responding to insulin (even when insulin levels are normal, which is what separates it from type 2 diabetes); this form is very uncommon. Genetic mutations (autosomal or mitochondrial) can lead to defects in beta cell function. Abnormal insulin action may also have been genetically determined in some cases. Any disease that causes extensive damage to the pancreas may lead to diabetes (for example, chronic pancreatitis and cystic fibrosis). Diseases associated with excessive secretion of insulin-antagonistic hormones can cause diabetes (which is typically resolved once the hormone excess is removed). Many drugs impair insulin secretion and some toxins damage pancreatic beta cells, whereas others increase insulin resistance (especially glucocorticoids which can provoke "steroid diabetes"). The ICD-10 (1992) diagnostic entity, malnutrition-related diabetes mellitus (ICD-10 code E12), was deprecated by the World Health Organization (WHO) when the current taxonomy was introduced in 1999.
Yet another form of diabetes that people may develop is double diabetes. This is when a type 1 diabetic becomes insulin resistant, the hallmark for type 2 diabetes or has a family history for type 2 diabetes. It was first discovered in 1990 or 1991.

The following is a list of disorders that may increase the risk of diabetes:

 Genetic defects of β-cell function
 Maturity onset diabetes of the young
 Mitochondrial DNA mutations
 Genetic defects in insulin processing or insulin action
 Defects in proinsulin conversion
 Insulin gene mutations
 Insulin receptor mutations
 Exocrine pancreatic defects (see Type 3c diabetes, i.e. pancreatogenic diabetes)
 Chronic pancreatitis
 Pancreatectomy
 Pancreatic neoplasia
 Cystic fibrosis
 Hemochromatosis
 Fibrocalculous pancreatopathy

 Endocrinopathies
 Growth hormone excess (acromegaly)
 Cushing syndrome
 Hyperthyroidism
 Hypothyroidism
 Pheochromocytoma
 Glucagonoma
 Infections
 Cytomegalovirus infection
 Coxsackievirus B
 Drugs
 Glucocorticoids
 Thyroid hormone
 β-adrenergic agonists
 Statins

Pathophysiology

Insulin is the principal hormone that regulates the uptake of glucose from the blood into most cells of the body, especially liver, adipose tissue and muscle, except smooth muscle, in which insulin acts via the IGF-1. Therefore, deficiency of insulin or the insensitivity of its receptors play a central role in all forms of diabetes mellitus.

The body obtains glucose from three main sources: the intestinal absorption of food; the breakdown of glycogen (glycogenolysis), the storage form of glucose found in the liver; and gluconeogenesis, the generation of glucose from non-carbohydrate substrates in the body. Insulin plays a critical role in regulating glucose levels in the body. Insulin can inhibit the breakdown of glycogen or the process of gluconeogenesis, it can stimulate the transport of glucose into fat and muscle cells, and it can stimulate the storage of glucose in the form of glycogen.

Insulin is released into the blood by beta cells (β-cells), found in the islets of Langerhans in the pancreas, in response to rising levels of blood glucose, typically after eating. Insulin is used by about two-thirds of the body's cells to absorb glucose from the blood for use as fuel, for conversion to other needed molecules, or for storage. Lower glucose levels result in decreased insulin release from the beta cells and in the breakdown of glycogen to glucose. This process is mainly controlled by the hormone glucagon, which acts in the opposite manner to insulin.

If the amount of insulin available is insufficient, or if cells respond poorly to the effects of insulin (insulin resistance), or if the insulin itself is defective, then glucose is not absorbed properly by the body cells that require it, and is not stored appropriately in the liver and muscles. The net effect is persistently high levels of blood glucose, poor protein synthesis, and other metabolic derangements, such as metabolic acidosis in cases of complete insulin deficiency.

When glucose concentration in the blood remains high over time, the kidneys reach a threshold of reabsorption, and the body excretes glucose in the urine (glycosuria). This increases the osmotic pressure of the urine and inhibits reabsorption of water by the kidney, resulting in increased urine production (polyuria) and increased fluid loss. Lost blood volume is replaced osmotically from water in body cells and other body compartments, causing dehydration and increased thirst (polydipsia). In addition, intracellular glucose deficiency stimulates appetite leading to excessive food intake (polyphagia).

Diagnosis

Diabetes mellitus is diagnosed with a test for the glucose content in the blood, and is diagnosed by demonstrating any one of the following:
 Fasting plasma glucose level ≥ 7.0 mmol/L (126 mg/dL). For this test, blood is taken after a period of fasting, i.e. in the morning before breakfast, after the patient had sufficient time to fast overnight.
 Plasma glucose ≥ 11.1 mmol/L (200 mg/dL) two hours after a 75 gram oral glucose load as in a glucose tolerance test (OGTT)
 Symptoms of high blood sugar and plasma glucose ≥ 11.1 mmol/L (200 mg/dL) either while fasting or not fasting
 Glycated hemoglobin (HbA1C) ≥ 48 mmol/mol (≥ 6.5 DCCT %).

A positive result, in the absence of unequivocal high blood sugar, should be confirmed by a repeat of any of the above methods on a different day. It is preferable to measure a fasting glucose level because of the ease of measurement and the considerable time commitment of formal glucose tolerance testing, which takes two hours to complete and offers no prognostic advantage over the fasting test. According to the current definition, two fasting glucose measurements above 7.0 mmol/L (126 mg/dL) is considered diagnostic for diabetes mellitus.

Per the WHO, people with fasting glucose levels from 6.1 to 6.9 mmol/L (110 to 125 mg/dL) are considered to have impaired fasting glucose. People with plasma glucose at or above 7.8 mmol/L (140 mg/dL), but not over 11.1 mmol/L (200 mg/dL), two hours after a 75 gram oral glucose load are considered to have impaired glucose tolerance. Of these two prediabetic states, the latter in particular is a major risk factor for progression to full-blown diabetes mellitus, as well as cardiovascular disease. The American Diabetes Association (ADA) since 2003 uses a slightly different range for impaired fasting glucose of 5.6 to 6.9 mmol/L (100 to 125 mg/dL).

Glycated hemoglobin is better than fasting glucose for determining risks of cardiovascular disease and death from any cause.

Prevention

There is no known preventive measure for type 1 diabetes. Type 2 diabetes—which accounts for 85–90% of all cases worldwide—can often be prevented or delayed by maintaining a normal body weight, engaging in physical activity, and eating a healthy diet. Higher levels of physical activity (more than 90 minutes per day) reduce the risk of diabetes by 28%. Dietary changes known to be effective in helping to prevent diabetes include maintaining a diet rich in whole grains and fiber, and choosing good fats, such as the polyunsaturated fats found in nuts, vegetable oils, and fish. Limiting sugary beverages and eating less red meat and other sources of saturated fat can also help prevent diabetes. Tobacco smoking is also associated with an increased risk of diabetes and its complications, so smoking cessation can be an important preventive measure as well.

The relationship between type 2 diabetes and the main modifiable risk factors (excess weight, unhealthy diet, physical inactivity and tobacco use) is similar in all regions of the world. There is growing evidence that the underlying determinants of diabetes are a reflection of the major forces driving social, economic and cultural change: globalization, urbanization, population aging, and the general health policy environment.

Management

Diabetes management concentrates on keeping blood sugar levels close to normal, without causing low blood sugar. This can usually be accomplished with dietary changes, exercise, weight loss, and use of appropriate medications (insulin, oral medications).

Learning about the disease and actively participating in the treatment is important, since complications are far less common and less severe in people who have well-managed blood sugar levels. The goal of treatment is an A1C level below 5.7%. Attention is also paid to other health problems that may accelerate the negative effects of diabetes. These include smoking, high blood pressure, metabolic syndrome obesity, and lack of regular exercise. Specialized footwear is widely used to reduce the risk of diabetic foot ulcers by relieving the pressure on the foot. Foot examination for patients living with diabetes should be done annually which includes sensation testing, foot biomechanics, vascular integrity and foot structure.

Concerning those with severe mental illness, the efficacy of type 2 diabetes self-management interventions is still poorly explored, with insufficient scientific evidence to show whether these interventions have similar results to those observed in the general population.

Lifestyle

People with diabetes can benefit from education about the disease and treatment, dietary changes, and exercise, with the goal of keeping both short-term and long-term blood glucose levels within acceptable bounds. In addition, given the associated higher risks of cardiovascular disease, lifestyle modifications are recommended to control blood pressure.

Weight loss can prevent progression from prediabetes to diabetes type 2, decrease the risk of cardiovascular disease, or result in a partial remission in people with diabetes. No single dietary pattern is best for all people with diabetes. Healthy dietary patterns, such as the Mediterranean diet, low-carbohydrate diet, or DASH diet, are often recommended, although evidence does not support one over the others. According to the ADA, "reducing overall carbohydrate intake for individuals with diabetes has demonstrated the most evidence for improving glycemia", and for individuals with type 2 diabetes who cannot meet the glycemic targets or where reducing anti-glycemic medications is a priority, low or very-low carbohydrate diets are a viable approach. For overweight people with type 2 diabetes, any diet that achieves weight loss is effective.

Medications

Glucose control

Most medications used to treat diabetes act by lowering blood sugar levels through different mechanisms. There is broad consensus that when people with diabetes maintain tight glucose control – keeping the glucose levels in their blood within normal ranges – they experience fewer complications, such as kidney problems or eye problems. There is however debate as to whether this is appropriate and cost effective for people later in life in whom the risk of hypoglycemia may be more significant.

There are a number of different classes of anti-diabetic medications. Type 1 diabetes requires treatment with insulin, ideally using a "basal bolus" regimen that most closely matches normal insulin release: long-acting insulin for the basal rate and short-acting insulin with meals. Type 2 diabetes is generally treated with medication that is taken by mouth (e.g. metformin) although some eventually require injectable treatment with insulin or GLP-1 agonists.

Metformin is generally recommended as a first-line treatment for type 2 diabetes, as there is good evidence that it decreases mortality. It works by decreasing the liver's production of glucose, and increasing the amount of glucose stored in peripheral tissue. Several other groups of drugs, mainly oral medication, may also decrease blood sugar in type 2 diabetes. These include agents that increase insulin release (sulfonylureas), agents that decrease absorption of sugar from the intestines (acarbose), agents that inhibit the enzyme dipeptidyl peptidase-4 (DPP-4) that inactivates incretins such as GLP-1 and GIP (sitagliptin), agents that make the body more sensitive to insulin (thiazolidinedione) and agents that increase the excretion of glucose in the urine (SGLT2 inhibitors). When insulin is used in type 2 diabetes, a long-acting formulation is usually added initially, while continuing oral medications. 

Some severe cases of type 2 diabetes may also be treated with insulin, which is increased gradually until glucose targets are reached.

Blood pressure lowering
Cardiovascular disease is a serious complication associated with diabetes, and many international guidelines recommend blood pressure treatment targets that are lower than 140/90 mmHg for people with diabetes. However, there is only limited evidence regarding what the lower targets should be. A 2016 systematic review found potential harm to treating to targets lower than 140 mmHg, and a subsequent systematic review in 2019 found no evidence of additional benefit from blood pressure lowering to between 130 – 140mmHg, although there was an increased risk of adverse events.

2015 American Diabetes Association recommendations are that people with diabetes and albuminuria should receive an inhibitor of the renin-angiotensin system to reduce the risks of progression to end-stage renal disease, cardiovascular events, and death. There is some evidence that angiotensin converting enzyme inhibitors (ACEIs) are superior to other inhibitors of the renin-angiotensin system such as angiotensin receptor blockers (ARBs), or aliskiren in preventing cardiovascular disease. Although a more recent review found similar effects of ACEIs and ARBs on major cardiovascular and renal outcomes. There is no evidence that combining ACEIs and ARBs provides additional benefits.

Aspirin 
The use of aspirin to prevent cardiovascular disease in diabetes is controversial. Aspirin is recommended by some in people at high risk of cardiovascular disease, however routine use of aspirin has not been found to improve outcomes in uncomplicated diabetes. 2015 American Diabetes Association recommendations for aspirin use (based on expert consensus or clinical experience) are that low-dose aspirin use is reasonable in adults with diabetes who are at intermediate risk of cardiovascular disease (10-year cardiovascular disease risk, 5–10%). National guidelines for England and Wales by the National Institute for Health and Care Excellence (NICE) recommend against the use of aspirin in people with type 1 or type 2 diabetes who do not have confirmed cardiovascular disease.

Surgery
Weight loss surgery in those with obesity and type 2 diabetes is often an effective measure. Many are able to maintain normal blood sugar levels with little or no medications following surgery and long-term mortality is decreased. There is, however, a short-term mortality risk of less than 1% from the surgery. The body mass index cutoffs for when surgery is appropriate are not yet clear. It is recommended that this option be considered in those who are unable to get both their weight and blood sugar under control.

A pancreas transplant is occasionally considered for people with type 1 diabetes who have severe complications of their disease, including end stage kidney disease requiring kidney transplantation.

Self-management and support
In countries using a general practitioner system, such as the United Kingdom, care may take place mainly outside hospitals, with hospital-based specialist care used only in case of complications, difficult blood sugar control, or research projects. In other circumstances, general practitioners and specialists share care in a team approach. Home telehealth support can be an effective management technique.

The use of technology to deliver educational programs for adults with type 2 diabetes includes computer-based self-management interventions to collect for tailored responses to facilitate self-management. There is no adequate evidence to support effects on cholesterol, blood pressure, behavioral change (such as physical activity levels and dietary), depression, weight and health-related quality of life, nor in other biological, cognitive or emotional outcomes.

Epidemiology

In 2017, 425 million people had diabetes worldwide, up from an estimated 382 million people in 2013 and from 108 million in 1980. Accounting for the shifting age structure of the global population, the prevalence of diabetes is 8.8% among adults, nearly double the rate of 4.7% in 1980. Type 2 makes up about 90% of the cases. Some data indicate rates are roughly equal in women and men, but male excess in diabetes has been found in many populations with higher type 2 incidence, possibly due to sex-related differences in insulin sensitivity, consequences of obesity and regional body fat deposition, and other contributing factors such as high blood pressure, tobacco smoking, and alcohol intake.

The WHO estimates that diabetes resulted in 1.5 million deaths in 2012, making it the 8th leading cause of death. However another 2.2 million deaths worldwide were attributable to high blood glucose and the increased risks of cardiovascular disease and other associated complications (e.g. kidney failure), which often lead to premature death and are often listed as the underlying cause on death certificates rather than diabetes. For example, in 2017, the International Diabetes Federation (IDF) estimated that diabetes resulted in 4.0 million deaths worldwide, using modeling to estimate the total number of deaths that could be directly or indirectly attributed to diabetes.

Diabetes occurs throughout the world but is more common (especially type 2) in more developed countries. The greatest increase in rates has however been seen in low- and middle-income countries, where more than 80% of diabetic deaths occur. The fastest prevalence increase is expected to occur in Asia and Africa, where most people with diabetes will probably live in 2030. The increase in rates in developing countries follows the trend of urbanization and lifestyle changes, including increasingly sedentary lifestyles, less physically demanding work and the global nutrition transition, marked by increased intake of foods that are high energy-dense but nutrient-poor (often high in sugar and saturated fats, sometimes referred to as the "Western-style" diet). The global number of diabetes cases might increase by 48% between 2017 and 2045.

As of 2020, 38% of all US adults had prediabetes. Prediabetes is an early stage of diabetes.

History

Diabetes was one of the first diseases described, with an Egyptian manuscript from  1500 BCE mentioning "too great emptying of the urine." The Ebers papyrus includes a recommendation for a drink to take in such cases. The first described cases are believed to have been type 1 diabetes. Indian physicians around the same time identified the disease and classified it as madhumeha or "honey urine", noting the urine would attract ants.

The term "diabetes" or "to pass through" was first used in 230 BCE by the Greek Apollonius of Memphis. The disease was considered rare during the time of the Roman empire, with Galen commenting he had only seen two cases during his career. This is possibly due to the diet and lifestyle of the ancients, or because the clinical symptoms were observed during the advanced stage of the disease. Galen named the disease "diarrhea of the urine" (diarrhea urinosa).

The earliest surviving work with a detailed reference to diabetes is that of Aretaeus of Cappadocia (2nd or early 3rdcentury CE). He described the symptoms and the course of the disease, which he attributed to the moisture and coldness, reflecting the beliefs of the "Pneumatic School". He hypothesized a correlation between diabetes and other diseases, and he discussed differential diagnosis from the snakebite, which also provokes excessive thirst. His work remained unknown in the West until 1552, when the first Latin edition was published in Venice.

Two types of diabetes were identified as separate conditions for the first time by the Indian physicians Sushruta and Charaka in 400–500 CE with one type being associated with youth and another type with being overweight. Effective treatment was not developed until the early part of the 20th century when Canadians Frederick Banting and Charles Herbert Best isolated and purified insulin in 1921 and 1922. This was followed by the development of the long-acting insulin NPH in the 1940s.

Etymology
The word diabetes ( or ) comes from Latin diabētēs, which in turn comes from Ancient Greek διαβήτης (diabētēs), which literally means "a passer through; a siphon". Ancient Greek physician Aretaeus of Cappadocia (fl. 1stcentury CE) used that word, with the intended meaning "excessive discharge of urine", as the name for the disease. Ultimately, the word comes from Greek διαβαίνειν (diabainein), meaning "to pass through", which is composed of δια- (dia-), meaning "through" and βαίνειν (bainein), meaning "to go". The word "diabetes" is first recorded in English, in the form diabete, in a medical text written around 1425.

The word mellitus ( or ) comes from the classical Latin word mellītus, meaning "mellite" (i.e. sweetened with honey; honey-sweet). The Latin word comes from mell-, which comes from mel, meaning "honey"; sweetness; pleasant thing, and the suffix -ītus, whose meaning is the same as that of the English suffix "-ite". It was Thomas Willis who in 1675 added "mellitus" to the word "diabetes" as a designation for the disease, when he noticed the urine of a person with diabetes had a sweet taste (glycosuria). This sweet taste had been noticed in urine by the ancient Greeks, Chinese, Egyptians, Indians, and Persians .

Society and culture

The 1989 "St. Vincent Declaration" was the result of international efforts to improve the care accorded to those with diabetes. Doing so is important not only in terms of quality of life and life expectancy but also economicallyexpenses due to diabetes have been shown to be a major drain on healthand productivity-related resources for healthcare systems and governments.

Several countries established more and less successful national diabetes programmes to improve treatment of the disease.

People with diabetes who have neuropathic symptoms such as numbness or tingling in feet or hands are twice as likely to be unemployed as those without the symptoms.

In 2010, diabetes-related emergency room (ER) visit rates in the United States were higher among people from the lowest income communities (526 per 10,000 population) than from the highest income communities (236 per 10,000 population). Approximately 9.4% of diabetes-related ER visits were for the uninsured.

Naming
The term "type 1 diabetes" has replaced several former terms, including childhood-onset diabetes, juvenile diabetes, and insulin-dependent diabetes mellitus. Likewise, the term "type 2 diabetes" has replaced several former terms, including adult-onset diabetes, obesity-related diabetes, and noninsulin-dependent diabetes mellitus. Beyond these two types, there is no agreed-upon standard nomenclature.

Diabetes mellitus is also occasionally known as "sugar diabetes" to differentiate it from diabetes insipidus.

Other animals

Diabetes can occur in mammals or reptiles. Birds do not develop diabetes because of their unusually high tolerance for elevated blood glucose levels.

In animals, diabetes is most commonly encountered in dogs and cats. Middle-aged animals are most commonly affected. Female dogs are twice as likely to be affected as males, while according to some sources, male cats are more prone than females. In both species, all breeds may be affected, but some small dog breeds are particularly likely to develop diabetes, such as Miniature Poodles.

Feline diabetes is strikingly similar to human type 2 diabetes. The Burmese, Russian Blue, Abyssinian, and Norwegian Forest cat breeds are at higher risk than other breeds. Overweight cats are also at higher risk.

The symptoms may relate to fluid loss and polyuria, but the course may also be insidious. Diabetic animals are more prone to infections. The long-term complications recognized in humans are much rarer in animals. The principles of treatment (weight loss, oral antidiabetics, subcutaneous insulin) and management of emergencies (e.g. ketoacidosis) are similar to those in humans.

References

External links 

 American Diabetes Association
 IDF Diabetes Atlas
 National Diabetes Education Program
 ADA's Standards of Medical Care in Diabetes 2019
 
 

 
Wikipedia medicine articles ready to translate
Metabolic disorders
Wikipedia emergency medicine articles ready to translate
Endocrine diseases
Cardiovascular diseases
Disability by type